Grand Traverse County is a county located in the U.S. state of Michigan. As of the 2020 census, the population was 95,238, making it the largest county in Northern Michigan. Its county seat is Traverse City. The county is part of the Traverse City micropolitan area, which also includes neighboring Benzie, Kalkaska, and Leelanau counties.

Long a part of territory under the Council of Three Fires (comprising the Ojibwe, Odawa, and Potawatomi), Grand Traverse County's first European settlement was established in 1839. It was originally created in 1840 as Omeena County, however it was reorganized in 1851 was Grand Traverse County. The county itself and Traverse City are named after Grand Traverse Bay, a bay of Lake Michigan.

Interlochen Center for the Arts, a prestigious boarding school, is located within the county.

History
Prior to European settlement, Grand Traverse County was part of territory under the Council of Three Fires (comprising the Ojibwe, Odawa, and Potawatomi). These people called the area at the head of Grand Traverse Bay  (Ojibwe: 'place at the head of the great bay').

As a duty of the federal government under the 1836 Treaty of Washington, the first permanent settlement in the county was the mission now known as Old Mission, established in May 1839 as "Grand Traverse". Grand Traverse Bay, from which the area takes its name, earned its name from 18th-century French voyageurs who made , or "the long crossing", across the mouth of bay.

The Michigan Legislature separated the unorganized Omeena County from part of Michilimackinac County in 1840. Omeena is derived from an Ojibwe expression, meaning "is it so?"

On April 7, 1851, an act of legislature organized Omeena County, effectively renaming it Grand Traverse County. The seat of government was designated to Boardman's Mills, a location in the young Traverse City. The future counties of Antrim, Benzie, Kalkaska, Leelanau, Manistee, Missaukee, and Wexford were subsequently attached to Grand Traverse County for administrative purposes, until being organized in their own rights. However, the act contained no provisions on formation of townships or choosing of election officials, thus Grand Traverse County had no legal government until 1858. That winter, an act of the state legislature completed the organization of Grand Traverse County and divided the county between two initial townships:
Peninsula Township, comprising the Old Mission Peninsula, and
Traverse Township, which encompassed the rest of the county.

Today, Grand Traverse County contains thirteen townships.

An 1884 article called the Traverse Region famous for "its productiveness of soil, salubrious climate and romantic scenery".

Historical markers
There are 12 recognized Michigan historical markers in the county:  They are:

 City Opera House
 Congregation Beth El
 Dougherty Mission House
 Fife Lake–Union District No. 1 Schoolhouse
 Friends Meetinghouse
 Grand Traverse Bay
 Hannah and Lay Mercantile Building
 Hesler Log House
 Interlochen
 Ladies Library Association
 Novotny's Saloon
 Traverse City Regional Psychiatric Hospital

Geography
Grand Traverse County is considered to be part of Northern Michigan. The highest point in Grand Traverse County is Exodus Hill in Long Lake Township, and the lowest point is the Grand Traverse Bay. Power Island, the largest island in Grand Traverse Bay, is part of Peninsula Township. The county is home to many notable lakes, including Arbutus Lake, Fife Lake, Green Lake, Silver Lake, Spider Lake, and part of Elk Lake. The county's largest inland lake is Long Lake.

Rivers 

 Betsie River, begins at Green Lake (although its tributaries extend much further into the county), flows west into Benzie County, and eventually to Lake Michigan at Frankfort.
 Boardman River, enters from the east from Kalkaska County, flows west and north until reaching West Bay in Traverse City.
 Platte River, begins at Long Lake and flows west to Lake DuBonnet and into Benzie County, eventually ending at Lake Michigan.

Adjacent counties
 Antrim County (northeast)
 Kalkaska County (east)
 Missaukee County (southeast)
 Wexford County (south)
 Manistee County (southwest)
 Benzie County (west)
 Leelanau County (northwest)

Protected area 

 Pere Marquette State Forest

State parks 

 Interlochen State Park
 Keith J. Charters Traverse City State Park
 Old Mission State Park

Transportation

Air service
Grand Traverse County is served commercially by Cherry Capital Airport, which is located near Traverse City. It serves the 21-county Northern Michigan area, and has year-round and seasonal destinations around the United States. In 2019, Cherry Capital Airport had the fourth-most enplanements of any airport in Michigan, behind Detroit Metropolitan Airport, Grand Rapids' Gerald R. Ford International Airport, and Flint's Bishop International Airport.

Other airparks in the county include:
 Acme Skyport
 Green Lake Airport
 Tramps Aerodrome
 Yuba Airport
Formerly, there was an airport on the south side of Traverse City called Ransom Field. This was located on Rennie Hill. This airport closed sometime in the 1930s.

Major highways
  runs through the county southwest to northeast. It provides access to cities to the north (like Charlevoix and Petoskey) and southwest (like  Ludington and Muskegon). The highway runs all the way to Spanish Fort, Alabama, to the south and runs through major cities like Indianapolis, Louisville, Nashville, and Birmingham.
  runs through the far southeast of the county, entirely within Fife Lake Township. The highway provides access to Kalkaska and Petoskey to the north, and cities like Cadillac, Grand Rapids, and Kalamazoo to the south. The southern end is at the Indiana Toll Road just across the state line.
  is the shortest highway segment within the county. It begins at an intersection in Traverse City, and runs northwest along the Grand Traverse Bay towards the county line. It then continues in Leelanau County up towards Northport and then runs southwesterly towards Glen Arbor, Frankfort, and Manistee.
  is the longest highway in the county. It runs from a cul-de-sac at Old Mission Point southerly to Traverse City and through Buckley. The highway then continues down through the state to Baldwin, Grand Rapids, Hastings, and Battle Creek.
  runs east-to-west in the county from northern Long Lake Township to near Williamsburg. The highway provides access to Empire and central Leelanau County to the west, and Kalkaska, Grayling, and Harrisville on the Lake Huron shore to the east.
  runs through the southern portion of the county, connecting M-37 to US 131 while passing through Kingsley and Walton.
  is a short highway providing a direct route from M-113 to US 131 and Fife Lake.
Previously, an additional highway, M-137, ran through Grand Traverse County, from US 31 in Green Lake Township south to Interlochen, passing by Interlochen Center for the Arts and Interlochen State Park. However, MDOT decommissioned the highway in 2020.

Bicycle route 

  parallels the shore of Grand Traverse Bay along a number of roadways and local trails, including those that are part of the TART Trails system.

Demographics

2000 census 

As of the census of 2000, there were 77,654 people, 30,396 households, and 20,730 families residing in the county. The racial makeup of the county was 96.51% White, 0.40% Black or African American, 0.93% Native American, 0.49% Asian, 0.03% Pacific Islander, 0.54% from other races, and 1.09% from two or more races.  1.49% of the population were Hispanic or Latino of any race. 25.1% were of German, 11.3% English, 10.7% Irish, 8.4% American and 7.4% Polish ancestry, 96.4% spoke English and 1.6% Spanish as their first language.

There were 30,396 households, out of which 32.80% had children under the age of 18 living with them, 55.70% were married couples living together, 9.20% had a female householder with no husband present, and 31.80% were non-families. 25.00% of all households were made up of individuals, and 9.00% had someone living alone who was 65 years of age or older.  The average household size was 2.49 and the average family size was 2.99.

In the county, the population was spread out, with 25.40% under the age of 18, 7.90% from 18 to 24, 29.70% from 25 to 44, 24.00% from 45 to 64, and 13.10% who were 65 years of age or older.  The median age was 38 years. For every 100 females, there were 95.20 males.  For every 100 females age 18 and over, there were 92.10 males.

The median income for a household in the county was $43,169, and the median income for a family was $51,211. Males had a median income of $34,796 versus $24,139 for females. The per capita income for the county was $22,111.  About 3.80% of families and 5.90% of the population were below the poverty line, including 5.30% of those under age 18 and 5.90% of those age 65 or over.

Religion
Grand Traverse County is part of the Roman Catholic Diocese of Gaylord.  It is also located in the Episcopal Diocese of Western Michigan.

Politics 
Historically, Grand Traverse County has been a Republican-leaning county; it has voted for the Republican candidate in every presidential election since the Civil War, except for four: 1912, 1932, 1936, and 1964. In the last decade, the county has become more politically competitive; though Democratic candidates have not carried the county since 1964, their margins of defeat have narrowed in recent elections. Traverse City leans Democratic while the rest of the county leans Republican.

In the 2022 Michigan gubernatorial election, Democrat Gretchen Whitmer received 27,396 votes (52.38%), making it the first time a Democratic gubernatorial candidate has carried the county since 1986.

In the 2020 presidential election, Donald Trump carried the county, despite losing the state of Michigan. In 2020, he won the county with 50.54% (30,502 votes), and in 2016, won with 52.73% (27,413 votes).

In 2008, Republican candidate John McCain received 24,716 votes in the county (50.60% of the total) to Democratic candidate Barack Obama's 23,258 (47.62%), even as Obama carried the state of Michigan by a double-digit margin. McCain's margin of victory was narrower than usual for a Republican candidate in the county.

In 2004, Republican president George W. Bush received 27,446 votes in the county (59.42%) to Democrat John Kerry's 18,256 (39.52%).

In 2000, Bush received 22,358 votes in the county (58.48%) to Democrat Al Gore's 14,371 (37.59%).

Government 
The county government operates the jail, maintains rural roads, operates the major local courts, keeps files of deeds and mortgages, maintains vital records, administers public health regulations, and participates with the state in the provision of welfare and other social services. The county board of commissioners controls the budget but has only limited authority to make laws or ordinances.  In Michigan, most local government functions — police and fire, building and zoning, tax assessment, street maintenance, etc. — are the responsibility of individual cities and townships.

Grand Traverse County is represented in the U.S. House of Representatives by Jack Bergman (R), and is part of Michigan's 1st congressional district.

In the Michigan House of Representatives, Grand Traverse County is divided between the 103rd and 104th districts. The 103rd, which comprises Traverse City and the townships of East Bay, Garfield, Long Lake, and Peninsula, is represented in Lansing by Betsy Coffia (D). The 104th, which comprises the rest of Grand Traverse County, is represented by John Roth (R). In the Michigan Senate, Grand Traverse County is part of the 37th Senate district, and is represented by John Damoose (R).

Elected officials 

 Prosecuting Attorney: Noelle Moeggenberg
 Sheriff: Tom Bensley
 County Clerk: Bonnie Scheele
 County Treasurer: Heidi Scheppe
 Register of Deeds: Peggy Haines
 Drain Commissioner: Andy Smits

County commission 

District 1: Brian McAllister
District 2: Lauren Flynn
District 3: Ashlea Walter
District 4: Brad Jewett (vice chair)
District 5: Rob Hentschel (chair)
District 6: Darryl Nelson
District 7: TJ Andrews
District 8: Scott Sieffert
District 9: Penny Morris

Law enforcement agencies

County 

 Grand Traverse County Sheriff's Department

City 

 Traverse City Police Department

Fire departments 
 Blair Township Fire Department
 Fife Lake Springfield Fire Department
 Grand Traverse Metro Fire Department
 Green Lake Township Emergency Services
 Long Lake Fire-Rescue
 Paradise Emergency Services
 Peninsula Township Fire Department
 City Of Traverse City Fire Department
 Whitewater Township Fire Department

Education

Primary and secondary 
Grand Traverse County is served by the following public school districts:

 Benzie Central Schools (BCS) serves the extreme southwestern corner of the county.
 Buckley Community School District (BCSD) serves the southwest of the county.
 Elk Rapids Schools (ERS) serves the northeasternmost areas of the county.
 Forest Area Community Schools (FACS) serves the southeast of the county, including the village of Fife Lake.
 Manton Consolidated Schools (MCS) serves a few square miles in the extreme southeastern corner of the county.
 Kingsley Area Schools (KAS) serves the south–center of the county, focused on the village of Kingsley.
 Traverse City Area Public Schools (TCAPS) serves most of the county, centered on Traverse City. The district contains two high schools, Traverse City Central and Traverse City West.

The county is also home to many smaller charter and private schools, most notably those that are a part of Grand Traverse Area Catholic Schools.

Post-secondary 
Grand Traverse County is home to Northwestern Michigan College, a public community college in Traverse City.

Economy
According to the Grand Traverse Economic Development Corporation, the largest employers in Grand Traverse County, as of 2017, are:

Communities

City
 Traverse City (county seat, partially in Leelanau County)

Villages
 Fife Lake
 Kingsley

Charter townships
 East Bay Township
 Garfield Township
 Long Lake Township

Civil townships

 Acme Township
 Blair Township
 Fife Lake Township
 Grant Township
 Green Lake Township
 Mayfield Township
 Paradise Township
 Peninsula Township
 Union Township
 Whitewater Township

Census-designated places
 Chums Corner
 Grawn
 Interlochen

Other unincorporated communities

 Acme
 Brookside
 Fivemile Corner
 Hannah
 Karlin
 Long Lake
 Mapleton
 Mayfield
 Monroe Center
 Neahtawanta
 Old Mission
 Summit City
 Walton
 Wexford Corner
 Williamsburg
 Yuba

Ghost towns

 Angell
 Archie
 Bates
 Bartlett
 Beitner
 Cedar Run
 East Bay
 Diamond Park
 Duck Lake Park
 East Bay
 Hilltop
 Hodge
 Keystone
 Kratochvil's Plat
 Lakeside Resort
 Mabel
 McManus Corner
 Moffatt
 Munro
 Neal
 Ogdensburg
 Pavlovic Corner
 Peninsula Resort
 Slights
 Skegemog Point
 Traverse Point
 Westminster
 Wylie

Indian reservation 
 Grand Traverse Band of Ottawa and Chippewa Indians

See also
 Cherry production in Michigan
 List of Michigan State Historic Sites in Grand Traverse County, Michigan
 National Register of Historic Places listings in Grand Traverse County, Michigan

References

External links

 Grand Traverse County Website
 Grand Traverse County Amateur Radio Public Service Corps Website
 

 
Michigan counties
Traverse City micropolitan area
Populated places established in 1851
1851 establishments in Michigan